Allen Ray Aldridge Sr. (April 27, 1944 – September 30, 2015) was an American football defensive end who played in the Canadian Football League, National Football League and World Football League. He played for the Houston Oilers and Cleveland Browns. In the Canadian Football League, Aldridge played for the Toronto Argonauts and the Hamilton Tiger-Cats. In 1968, he was named to the East All-Star team. He also played college football for the Prairie View A&M Panthers.

References

External links
Just Sports Stats
WFL profile

1945 births
2015 deaths
American football defensive ends
Canadian football defensive linemen
African-American players of American football
African-American players of Canadian football
Prairie View A&M Panthers football players
Toronto Argonauts players
Hamilton Tiger-Cats players
Houston Oilers players
Cleveland Browns players
Players of American football from Texas
People from Eagle Lake, Texas
Shreveport Steamer players
Chicago Winds players
20th-century African-American sportspeople
21st-century African-American people